The Roman castra Arutela is a historical monument, situated between Paușa and Căciulata, near the town Călimănești. It is estimated to have been constructed between 137 – 138 A.D. The building lies on the left bank of the Olt River, nearby the Cozia Monastery and the Turnu hydropower complex.

The dating of the construction was done based on inscriptions discovered in two samples of the front of two of the castra's gates. These samples suggest that the castra was constructed in the time of Hadrian by a detachment of Syrian archers in 138, under the orders of Titus Flavius Constans, military governor of Dacia Inferior. The last coins discovered and dated at Arutela were issued between the years 220 – 223 A.D. Arutela also hosted a Dacian settlement, which enjoyed a prolonged existence under Roman rule.

Ancient sources

Ptolemy's Geographia

Tabula Peutingeriana

Etymology

History

Dacian town

Roman times

Archaeology 

The first excavations at "Poiana Bivolari" were made in 1888–1889 in order to capture sulfurous thermal water. The excavation uncovered metal objects and Roman coins of Hadrian, Septimius Severus, Iulia Doamna and Caracalla. Between 1890 and 1892, Grigore Tocilescu and Pamfil Polonic continued with partial excavations, completely uncovering Roman baths and partial ruins of the castra. These discoveries remain the only epigraphic materials found on the site. Between 1897 and 1902, the Arutela ruins were partially covered by the construction of a railroad between Râmnicu Vâlcea and Râul Vadului, while the baths disappeared completely.

In 1967, the National Military Museum reopened the research site until 1970, and opened it once more in 1978. The opening led to the complete exposure of the ruins which were not destroyed by the railroad construction.

The archaeological excavations uncovered weapons, coins, pots and inscriptions, on display today at the Bucharest National Military Museum. After the excavations finished, the Arutela castrum became a historical monument of the Vâlcea County Committee of Culture and the Museum of History in Râmnicu Vâlcea. In 1982–1983, the castrum was renewed in a project by the architect Aurel Teodorescu, following references prepared by Cristian Vlădescu, the coordinator of research previously performed by the Military Museum. The construction work was executed by C. Panco. The first "Praetorian gate" (porta praetoria) in Romania was reconstructed on the site.

See also 
Dacian davae
List of ancient cities in Thrace and Dacia
Dacia
Roman Dacia

Notes

References

Ancient

Modern 

Dacian towns
Archaeological sites in Romania
Ruins in Romania
Roman legionary fortresses in Romania
History of Oltenia